Gary Morgan (born 1 April 1961) is an English former footballer who played in the Scottish Football League for Berwick Rangers and the Football League in England for Darlington in the 1980s. He played as a left back.

Morgan began his football career with home-town club Consett before spending two seasons playing in the Scottish Second Division for Berwick Rangers. In 1985, he returned to England to join Football League Third Division club Darlington for a £10,000 fee. During his four years with the club they were relegated twice. He left after the second relegation, that took the club into the Conference. He later played non-league football for Bishop Auckland.

References

1961 births
Living people
Sportspeople from Consett
Footballers from County Durham
English footballers
Association football defenders
Consett A.F.C. players
Berwick Rangers F.C. players
Darlington F.C. players
Bishop Auckland F.C. players
Scottish Football League players
English Football League players
Northern Football League players